The following 32 first-class cricketers have been appointed as Hampshire County Cricket Club as club captain since 1864.
 
  George Ede 1864-1869
  Clement Booth 1875-1878
  Arthur Wood 1879
  Sir Russell Bencraft 1880-1882
  Arthur Wood 1883-1885
  Sir Francis Lacey 1888-1889
  Sir Russell Bencraft 1895
  Teddy Wynyard 1896-1899 
  Charles Robson 1900-1902
  Edward Sprot 1903-1914
  Lionel Hallam Tennyson 1919-1932
  Ronnie Aird 1931
  Giles Baring 1931
  Stephen Fry 1931
  Phil Mead 1931
  Geoffrey Lowndes 1934-1935
  Dick Moore 1936-1937
  Cecil Paris 1938
  George Taylor 1939
  Desmond Eagar 1946-1957
  Colin Ingleby-Mackenzie 1958-1965
  Roy Marshall 1966-1970
  Richard Gilliat 1971-1978
  Bob Stephenson 1979
  Nick Pocock 1980-1984
  Mark Nicholas 1985-1995
  John Stephenson 1996-1997
  Robin Smith 1998-2002
  John Crawley 2003
  Shane Warne 2004–2007
  Dimitri Mascarenhas 2008–2009
  Dominic Cork 2010–2011
  Jimmy Adams 2012–2015
  James Vince 2016 to date

Captains
Hampshire County Cricket Club
Hampshire